Anisus calculiformis is a very small species of air-breathing freshwater snail, an aquatic pulmonate gastropod mollusk in the family Planorbidae, the ram's horn snails.

Synonyms 
Most authors misidentified Anisus calculiformis, applying the name Anisus septemgyratus to animals which are in reality Anisus calculiformis. So Anisus septemgyratus auct. (not Rossmässler) is synonymous with Anisus calculiformis.

The database WoRMS on the other hand considers this name a junior synonym of Anisus septemgyratus (Rossmässler, 1835)

Distribution 
This species occurs in:
 Czech Republic – in Moravia, critically endangered (CR)
 Poland
 Slovakia
 British Isles
 ...

See also 
 Anisus leucostoma

References

External links 
 http://www.animalbase.uni-goettingen.de/zooweb/servlet/AnimalBase/home/species?id=3240

Planorbidae
Gastropods described in 1874